HR 511 (also designated V987 Cassiopeiae and Gliese 75 among others) is an orange dwarf of spectral type K0V in the constellation Cassiopeia. With an apparent magnitude of 5.63, it is faintly visible to the naked eye. The star is relatively close, 32.8 light years from the Sun.

This star is estimated to be about the same age as the Sun, with 83% of the mass of the Sun and 82% of the Sun's radius. It has not been identified as a member of any moving star groups. This star has displayed unusual emissions of Ca II and is much more x-ray luminous than the Sun. It is considered a relatively active star. Based on an iron abundance of [Fe/H] = −0.02, the metallicity of this star appears to be similar to that of the Sun.

References

External links

 SolStation

K-type main-sequence stars
HR, 0511
0511
010780
Cassiopeiae, V987
BY Draconis variables
008362
Gliese and GJ objects
Durchmusterung objects
Cassiopeia (constellation)